Erika Raue (born 1 May 1938) is a German athlete. She competed in the women's javelin throw at the 1956 Summer Olympics.

References

1938 births
Living people
Athletes (track and field) at the 1956 Summer Olympics
German female javelin throwers
Olympic athletes of the United Team of Germany
Athletes from Leipzig